The Atomic Bitchwax is an American stoner rock band from New Jersey, formed in 1992 by bassist/singer/songwriter Chris Kosnik, guitarist Ed Mundell, and drummer Keith Ackerman. They did not release their first full-length album until 1999, upon signing with Tee Pee Records. Mixing elements of 1960s psychedelic rock and 1970s riff rock filtered through modern progressive rock, their music has appeared in TV shows such as Jackass, Homewrecker, and various Fox Sports broadcasts.

The first version of the group became a local jam band playing the New Jersey and New York area. This lineup released two full-length records, a self-titled debut in 1999, and Atomic Bitchwax II in 2000. In addition, they released the Spit Blood EP in 2002 via the MeteorCity label. In 2004, Mundell was unable to keep up with the planned tour schedule and replaced by guitarist/vocalist Finn Ryan (formerly of Core). Since then, the band has released nine studio albums and has performed 1,500 live concerts. Their 2006 EP Boxriff was engineered by Jack Endino.

Current Monster Magnet drummer Bob Pantella joined the band in 2007, and the album TAB4 was released the following year. In 2011, they released the album The Local Fuzz, which consisted of one 42-minute track of 50 riffs back-to-back. In the following years, the band toured throughout the world. Kosnik became a member of Monster Magnet in 2013 in addition to his duties with The Atomic Bitchwax. The album Gravitron was released in 2015, followed by Force Field in 2017. Ryan left the band after 15 years in 2018, and was replaced by Monster Magnet guitarist Garrett Sweeny who appears on the bands 2020 release Scorpio.

Personnel

Current members
 
 Chris Kosnik - bass, vocals (formerly Monster Magnet, Godspeed and Black NASA)
 Bob Pantella - drums, percussion (formerly of Raging Slab, currently of Monster Magnet, Riotgod, Cycle of Pain) 
 Garrett Sweeny - lead guitar, vocals (currently of Monster Magnet)

Former members
 Ed Mundell - guitar (Monster Magnet, The Ultra Electric Mega Galactic)
 Keith Ackerman - drums, percussion
 Finn Ryan - guitar, vocals (formerly of Core)

Discography

Albums
The Atomic Bitchwax (1999 MIA Records/Tee Pee Records)
Atomic Bitchwax II (2000 Tee Pee Records)
3 (2005 MeteorCity)
TAB 4/T4B (2008 MeteorCity)
The Local Fuzz (2011 Tee Pee Records)
Gravitron (2015 Tee Pee Records)
Force Field (2017 Tee Pee Records)
Scorpio (2020 Tee Pee Records)

EPs
Spit Blood (2002 MeteorCity)
Boxriff (2006 MeteorCity)

Compilation appearances
"Hey Alright" on Welcome to Meteor City (1999 MeteorCity Records)
"Combination" on Right in the Nuts: A Tribute to Aerosmith (2000 Small Stone Records)
"Kiss the Sun" on Doomed (2000 This Dark Reign Records)
"Liquor Queen" on The Mighty Desert Rock Avengers (2002 People Like You Records)
"Hey Alright" on Guerrilla Jukebox Vol 1 (2003 Tee Pee Records)
"STD" & "The Destroyer" on ...And Back to Earth Again (2007 MeteorCity Records)

References

Musicians from New Jersey
People from Long Branch, New Jersey
American stoner rock musical groups
Jersey Shore musical groups
Musical groups established in 1992
1992 establishments in New Jersey